The leading technological and scientific university of the Altai region, Altai State Technical University (AltSTU) is one of a number of universities in the city of Barnaul, Altai Krai, Russia, and is among the largest institutions of higher education in Russia.

It was founded in February 1942 by Zaporizhie Automechanical Institute (which was evacuated to Siberia because of World War II). Altai State University is named after Ivan Polzunov, the famous Russian inventor of the two-cylinder steam engine for use in the mining industry.

The University offers full-time, part-time, extramural, and distance instruction. On graduating, students receive degrees of Bachelor (four-year study), Master (two years), and specialist diplomas (per the old system of five-year study).  Post-graduate courses are also offered.

University facilities include seven academic buildings, a complex of hostels, a large scientific library, a computing center, a publishing house, student clubs, a theater (the Kaleidoscope Student Theatre ), a preventive clinic, as well as a skiing lodge, a private Olympiyskiy swimming pool, and a sports and rest camp by the River Ob.

University campus layout designed by students of the Institute of Architecture and Design

Faculties
 Faculty of Humanities
 Faculty of Information Technology 
 Faculty of Special Technologies 
 Faculty of Civil Engineering 
 Faculty of Energy Engineering 
 Faculty of Power Engineering and Road Transport 
 Faculty of Pre-University Training 
 University College of Technology after V.V. Petrov

Institutions
 Institute of Architecture and Design
 Institute of Biotechnology, Food and Chemical Engineering
 Institute for the Development of Continuing Professional Education 
 Institute of Economics and Management 
 Extramural Institute

Branches
 Biysk Technological Institute, Biysk
 Rubtsovsk Industrial Institute, Rubtsovsk

Recognition

Altai State Technical University annually co-hosts Russian semi-finals of the international competitive programming team contest ICPC. Siberian and Far Eastern, Kazakhstan and Kyrgyzstan teams are gathering in Barnaul, at the same time, teams from the European part gather in another center, St. Petersburg, Russia, and with the use of the Internet results are synchronized. 
AltSTU teams from students of the specialty "Software Engineering" (Faculty of Information Technology), as a result of complex selection, successfully reached the final of this championship and won internationally recognized prizes:
 ACM ICPC 2006 final (San Antonio, United States) - AltSTU won a gold medal, 3rd absolute place;
 ACM ICPC 2009 final (Stockholm, Sweden) - AltSTU won a silver medal, 8th absolute place.

In January 2019, a Biysk Technological Institute (AltSTU branch) project to develop physical principles of ultrasonic drilling of the surface of extraterrestrial objects to detect water and ice won a collaboration grant from RFBR and National Natural Science Foundation of China. The grant amounted to 1.3 million Rubles (14,470€) a year, and the project itself is planned for two years.

In 2019, the university was among the winners of the "Best educational programs of innovative Russia" contest. 

The best Russian curricula include thirteen AltSTU educational programs: 
 07.03.01 - “Architecture”; 
 08.03.01 - “Construction of Buildings”; 
 09.03.01 - “Informatics and Computer Engineering”; 
 09.03.03 - “Applied Informatics”; 
 09.03.04 - "Software Engineering"; 
 09.04.01 - “Informatics and Computer Engineering”; 
 10.03.01 - “Information Security”; 
 13.03.02 - "Power Industry and Electrical Engineering"; 
 13.03.03 - "Power Engineering"; 
 13.04.02 - "Power industry and Electrical Engineering"; 
 13.04.03 - "Power Engineering"; 
 15.03.01 - "Machine Engineering"; 
 23.03.01 - “Technology of Transport Processes”.

According to experts, these programs are distinguished by a high level of specialist training, teaching staff professionalism, good material and technical support of the educational process, a high level of funded research work, and the demand for graduates in the industry.

International relations
 Institute of International Education and Cooperation of AltSTU educates foreign students in Russian language instruction; coordinates cultural adaptation of foreign nationals to the new language environment; promotes cross-cultural events and traditions, and offers pre-university training for a foreign student to become well-prepared to study in Russian universities. Upon completion, students are certified to apply for programs of study in economics, management, education, and business.
 UNESCO department started December 16, 1995, when an agreement to establish the department was signed by the UNESCO Director-General and the AltSTU rector. 
 Grand Altai Development Institute was created for more efficient and effective cooperation of AltSTU with research and educational institutions, organizations, and enterprises of the Grand Altai region in supporting and developing the region's economic, research, and technical potential. It includes Grand Altai Research & Education, network edition journal.

References

Universities in Altai Krai
Universities and institutes established in the Soviet Union
Education in Barnaul
Technical universities and colleges in Russia